= Loyandford =

American women's fashion brand

- Type: Private
- Industry: Clothing
- Founded: 1999
- Founder: Stefan Loy and Frank Ford
- Headquarters: Ibiza, Spain
- Website: Loyandford Homepage

Loyandford is a woman's fashion brand established in 1999 in Los Angeles by German Designers Stefan Loy and Frank Ford. Since 2003 the Loyandford collection has been available in clothing shops in the US, Canada, Japan, Australia, Germany, England, Korea, Italy, Spain, and Hong Kong. In 2005 the design duo was chosen from the Smithsonian Institution to present their designs at the Cooper Hewitt museum in New York.

Known for their stage clothes, Loyandford has been worn by celebrities such as Cher, The Rolling Stones, Lenny Kravitz and Britney Spears. The brand reached mainstream consumers when Angelina Jolie promoted the film Lara Croft wearing their tank top with an AK47 on it.
